The Institute for Simulation and Training (IST) is a research institute of the University of Central Florida located in Orlando, Florida, United States.  Grace Bochenek, Ph.D. was appointed director of IST in early 2021. She was previously the director of the U.S. Army Tank Automotive Research, Development and Engineering Center (2006-12) and the chief technology officer of the U.S. Army Materiel Command, and served as acting secretary of energy for the U.S. Department of Energy (2017). 

The Institute provides a wide range of research and information services for the modeling, simulation and training community of Central Florida. As well, the institute aids in undergraduate and graduate studies in modeling and simulation leading to bachelor's degrees, master's degrees, Professional Science Master's and doctoral degrees.  IST is a member of the National Center for Simulation.

See also
University of Central Florida

External links
University of Central Florida
Institute for Simulation and Training
 Peter Hancock D.Sc, Phd

References

University of Central Florida
Simulation
1982 establishments in Florida
Research institutes in Florida